Operation Rubicon (1970 - 2018) was a joint US-German intelligence effort to spy on government communications through manipulated encryption software.

Operation Rubicon may also refer to:
 Operation Rubicon (police investigation), a Scottish investigation into allegations from Tommy Sheridan in 2011 that journalists had illegally wiretapped him
 the codename given to the 1851 French coup d'état by the French security forces